Margaret Joyce Inness (4 November 1931 – 5 October 2012) was a New Zealand cricketer who played as a right-arm pace bowler. She appeared in three Test matches for New Zealand between 1954 and 1957. She played domestic cricket for Canterbury and Wellington.

References

External links
 
 

1931 births
2012 deaths
Cricketers from Christchurch
New Zealand women cricketers
New Zealand women Test cricketers
Canterbury Magicians cricketers
Wellington Blaze cricketers